Casalvecchio Siculo (Sicilian: Casalvecchiu Sìculu) is a comune (municipality) in the Metropolitan City of Messina in the Italian region Sicily, located about  east of Palermo and about  southwest of Messina.

Main sights

Church of Santi Pietro e Paolo d'Agrò, one of the most important structures in the Agrò river valley and in the Metropolitan City of Messina. The current structure was built by Roger II of Sicily in 1117 and remade in 1172. It is characterized by a mix of Byzantine, Arab and Norman styles. The exterior appearance resembles that of a fortress, with two towers flanking the facade. The interior has a nave and two aisles.
Mother church, also dating 1117 but totally rebuilt in the 17th century.

References

Cities and towns in Sicily